Naqqareh Kub or Naqareh Kub may refer to:
 Naqqareh Kub-e Jadid, East Azerbaijan Province
 Naqqareh Kub-e Qadim, East Azerbaijan Province
 Naqareh Kub, Kermanshah